Izambart is a surname. Notable people with the surname include:

Georges Izambard (1848–1931), French school teacher, best known as the teacher and benefactor of poet Arthur Rimbaud
Sébastien Izambard (born 1973), French musician, singer, composer, and record producer